Rattan may refer to:

Rattan is the name for roughly 600 species of old world climbing palms belonging to subfamily Calamoideae. 
 It may also refer to baskets and furniture made from the plants
Rattan, Oklahoma is a town in Pushmataha County, Oklahoma, United States.
Hind Rattan is an award granted annually to non-resident persons of Indian origin. 
Rattan (film) is a 1944 Indian Bollywood film.
Rattan Lal Kataria is an Indian politician from Haryana.
Rattan Jaidka was the first Malaysian-born English county cricketer.
Rattan Bai was the ancestress of several Bollywood film stars.
Rattan (Ludhiana West)  is a village located in the Ludhiana West tehsil, of Ludhiana district, Punjab.
Volney Rattan was an American botanist.
Rattan (Chinese TV series), 2021 Chinese television series.
Rattan Raju Ramavarapu is an Indian Networker

See also 
 Ratan (disambiguation)